Lights and Perfections is the second studio album from The Burial. Facedown Records released the album on March 27, 2012. The Burial worked with Josh Schroeder, in the production of this album.

Critical reception

Awarding the album four stars from HM, Charlie Steffens states, "Crushing. Edifying. A great album." Giving the album four and a half stars at Jesus Freak Hideout, Scott Fryberger writes, "The Burial's latest album is an excellent display of hardcore done right." Brody Barbour, indicating in a four star review by Indie Vision Music, describes, "While Lights and Perfections is not a perfect record it is a thoroughly enjoyable progressive metal record that is easier to listen to than most other counterparts." Awarding the album three and a half stars at The New Review, Jonathan Anderson says, "I fear the replayability of Lights and Perfections is in jeopardy."

Track listing

Personnel
The Burial
 Elisha Mullins - Vocals, Guitars
 Todd Hatfield - Guitars
 Jake Neece - Bass
 Kaleb Luebchow - Drums

Production
 Josh Schroeder - Recording, Mixing, Mastering, Producer, Photographer
 Dave Quiggle - Artwork, Layout

References

2012 albums
The Burial (metal band) albums
Facedown Records albums